Julien "Skip" Mills (born March 10, 1985) is an American basketball player. Standing at 195 cm (6 ft 5 in), Mills usually plays as shooting guard.

Professional career
In August 2009, Mills signed with Cairns Taipans of the NBL.

In April 2011, Mills was honored with the DBL Statistical Player of the Year award during his season with Den Bosch, after averaging a league-high efficiency rating of 18.4.  Additionally, Mills was named to the All-DBL Team.

References

1985 births
Living people
American expatriate basketball people in Australia
American expatriate basketball people in Hungary
American expatriate basketball people in Israel
American expatriate basketball people in the Netherlands
American men's basketball players
Ball State Cardinals men's basketball players
Barak Netanya B.C. players
Basketball players from Indiana
Cairns Taipans players
Heroes Den Bosch players
Dutch Basketball League players
Fort Wayne Mad Ants players
Ironi Ashkelon players
Shooting guards
Soproni KC players
Szolnoki Olaj KK players